Giovanna Antonella Andrade Franco (born October 7, 1985) is an Ecuadorian actress and television presenter, known for her roles in telenovelas such as  and .

Biography
Giovanna Andrade was born in Guayaquil on October 7, 1985. She began her television career in 2004, making her debut as the protagonist in the telenovela  for the Ecuavisa network. After finishing recording, she decided to dedicate herself to acting, and to continue her training at the Lee Strasberg Theatre Institute in New York, but this plan was interrupted when she experienced a difficult pregnancy. She instead attended a theater workshop with Mexican actress  in Florida.

She returned to Ecuador in 2006, and a year later she starred in the successful  for Ecuavisa, where she played "La Niña" María Gracia.

In 2008, Andrade made her film debut in the Ecuadorian drama , along with Érika Vélez, Christian Bach, and William Levy. At the same time, she joined the Peruvian telenovela .

In 2011, she starred in the music video for "No me pidas tiempo" by the Guayaquil singer Daniel Beta. In 2011, she moved to Canal Uno, where she hosted the morning show Divinas. Later, she joined the Telerama network, where she hosted the programs N 'Boga and De mujer a mujer. In 2013, she made a guest appearance on the comic series  on Ecuavisa.

In 2016, Andrade returned to Ecuavisa as host of the program Desde casa, for network's international broadcast. The same year she had a starring role in the first season of the telenovela La Trinity.

In 2018, she signed an exclusive contract with the Colombian network RCN Televisión, making her debut on the second season of the telenovela Heart's Decree. Later she joined the series El final del paraíso.

In 2019, Andrade announced through social networks that she would be part of a beauty contest called Mrs. Globe in Shenzhen, China, representing Ecuador. She participated with 71 other candidates from different countries. During the gala, she wore a typical costume inspired by the Ecuadorian mountains, and was chosen vice-queen of the contest. Later, due to differences with organizers, she gave up the title and her crown.

Filmography
  (2004) ... María Ochoa
  (2007–2008) ... María Gracia Echeverría "La Niña"
  (2009) ... Paola
 El Enano (2009) ... Sirenita
  (2009) ... Ivonne
 Puro Corazón (2009) ... Roxana
  (2010) ... María Gracia Echeverría "La Niña"
  (2010) ... Blanquita
  (2013) ... Rebeca
  (2016) ... Teresa
 La Trinity (2016–2017) ... Roxana "Rochi"
 Kiquirimiau (2017) ... Lucía
 Heart's Decree 2 (2018–2019) ... Macarena Soler
 'El final del paraíso (2019) ... Marcela Pinzón

TV programs
 Divinas (2011), Canal Uno
 De mujer a mujer (2012–2015), Telerama
 N' Boga (2012–2015), Telerama
 Desde casa (2016–present), 

Film
 '' (2008) ... Andrea

Music videos
 "No me pidas tiempo" by Daniel Beta (2011)
 "Si tú la ves" by Nicky Jam and Wisin (2017)

References

External links
 

1985 births
Ecuadorian film actresses
Ecuadorian telenovela actresses
Ecuadorian television presenters
Ecuadorian women television presenters
Living people
People from Guayaquil
21st-century Ecuadorian women